Emily Henry is a New York Times bestselling American author who is best known for her romance novels Beach Read, People We Meet on Vacation, and Book Lovers.

Life and career

Henry lives and writes in Cincinnati and Kentucky's Northern Ohio River region. She studied creative writing at Hope College and the now-defunct New York Center for Art & Media Studies. She is a full-time writer and proofreader. 

Her debut young adult novel, The Love That Split the World, was published in January 2016. After writing several young adult novels, Henry's first adult fiction romance Beach Read was published in 2020 to widespread success. Her books have been featured in BuzzFeed, O, The Oprah Magazine, Entertainment Weekly, The New York Times, The Skimm, Shondaland, and more. She has continued to write adult romance novels with the publication of People We Meet on Vacation in 2021 and Book Lovers in 2022. Her next novel, Happy Place, is forthcoming in April 2023.

Bibliography

Young Adult Fiction
The Love That Split the World (2016) 
A Million Junes (2017) 
When the Sky Fell on Splendor (2019) 
Hello Girls with Brittany Cavallaro (2019) 

Adult Fiction
Beach Read (2020) 
People We Meet on Vacation (2021) 
Book Lovers (2022) 
Happy Place (2023) ISBN 9780593441275

Awards

 2021 Winner Goodreads Choice Awards - Best Romance for People We Meet on Vacation 
 2022 Winner Goodreads Choice Awards - Best Romance for Book Lovers

References

External Links

Living people
American women novelists
21st-century American novelists
21st-century American women writers
American young adult novelists
Hope College alumni
Women writers of young adult literature
Year of birth missing (living people)